The 2020 Philippines Football League, also known as The Philippines Football League brought to you by Qatar Airways, due to the league's title sponsorship, was the fourth season of the Philippines Football League (PFL), the professional football league of the Philippines.

For the first time, the champion of the tournament qualified for the Group Stage of the 2021 AFC Champions League, which was expanded to 40 teams from previous 32.

Originally scheduled to start on March 21, 2020, the league was postponed due to the COVID-19 pandemic. The league was supposed to commence on October 25, 2020, under a shortened calendar with each club playing a total of only five matches. However the opener was postponed once again to October 28 due to five players and a coach testing positive for COVID-19, as well as due to anticipated inclement weather by Typhoon Molave (Quinta).

All matches were held at the PFF National Training Center in Carmona, Cavite. The 2020 season played under a bubble format with all players and staff restricted to the Seda Nuvali hotel in Santa Rosa, Laguna, where they were checked-in for the entire duration of the season, and the playing venue in Carmona.

United City, which had been rebranded from Ceres–Negros starting this season, are the three-time defending champions. As Ceres–Negros, they have won every season of top-tier Philippine professional league football so far in the PFL era. They successfully defended their title when they won 7–1 against Stallion Laguna on November 6, 2020, with one match to spare and winning its previous three matches. Kaya–Iloilo became the first-ever team in PFL history to remain unbeaten during the duration of the league and not win the title.

Impact of the COVID-19 pandemic

Postponement
Due to the COVID-19 pandemic, the league's commencement, originally scheduled for March 21, was postponed at two times. First, the league's opening match was moved to April 18, and was later moved again to late-May. The league adopted a double home-and-away format for the 2020 seasons, with each club playing against each other four times for a total of 60 matches.

The Philippine Football Federation (PFF) is planning to start the league on July 15 with practice sessions for the league's member clubs planned to commence on June 15. The PFF has submitted a 27-page document outlying the protocols on how to organize the league amidst the pandemic to the Games and Amusements Board (GAB) on May 30 for approval prior to sending the same to the Inter-Agency Task Force for the Management of Emerging Infectious Diseases (IATF-EID) on June 1.

The IATF-EID announced on July 3, that it has allowed the clubs of the PFL to conduct training. The PFF plans to start the season on August 15. Staff and players of the member PFL clubs underwent RT-PCR testing for COVID-19 on July 8, 2020.

A joint administration order by GAB, the Department of Health, and the Philippine Sports Commission was released within the July 2020, but start of training was postponed due to the re-imposition of modified enhanced community quarantine in Metro Manila and nearby provinces from August 4 to 18. GAB and the IATF allowed the league to start. The PFF spent an estimated amount of  just to start the postponed season.

The kickoff of the league on October 25 was postponed due to expected inclement weather conditions caused by Typhoon Molave (Quinta). Also nine people including five players and a coach from two clubs tested positive for COVID-19. The league organizers maintained that the disease has been contained and the season began on October 28, 2020.

Format changes
Due to the league's postponement, the league for the 2020 season feature a shortened calendar to be played under a single round-robin format, instead of a double round-robin format with each team playing only five matches for the whole season. Several situational calendars have been prepared for the planning of the league's schedule.

There was a prior plan to adopt a playoff finals consisting of a semifinals and finals phase after the regular season. The league last had a playoff finals in the 2017 season which was known as the Final Series. This plan was scrapped in favor of a shorter schedule to minimize injury risk for the league's players.

The Copa Paulino Alcantara for the 2020 season was cancelled due to the time constraints caused by the postponement of the league. Due to this, the league second placers will qualify for the 2021 AFC Champions League playoffs scheduled for February 2021.

Bubble

Due to the COVID-19 pandemic players and staff of the PFL for the 2020 season were confined in a "bubble" setup. For the duration of the season they will only be allowed at the Seda Nuvali hotel in Santa Rosa, Laguna where they were checked-in and the PFF National Training Center in Carmona, Cavite where training and league matches were held. Players and staff underwent a series of test prior and shortly after entering the "bubble".

Schedule
The PFL bubble followed the schedule below:

The league final match day which was originally scheduled on November 12, 2020, was cancelled due to Typhoon Vamco (Ulysses).

Teams

Six clubs, including the Azkals Development Team, participated in the 2020 season. Ceres-Negros rebranded as United City and competed under that name starting the 2020 season. Green Archers United and Philippine Air Force decided not to participate for this season. Newly formed Maharlika F.C. (later renamed Maharlika Manila F.C.) applied to join the league, which was eventually approved. After a scandal involving Global F.C. refusing to pay their players' salaries, the PFF and PFL ordered Global to comply with the regulations and sort out all their payments within 10 days. After 10 days, Global had still not paid, and therefore their case was referred to the PFF's Club Licensing First Instance Body (FIB), and rendered them unable to compete in the 2020 season. Appropriate licensing fees for applicant clubs were waived due to the COVID-19 pandemic.

Stadium
Most league matches were originally planned to be held at the Rizal Memorial Stadium instead of the club's designated home stadiums for the 2020 season. The clubs were requested to hold their training sessions at the venue.

The Rizal Memorial Stadium and the Biñan Football Stadium were ruled out as possible primary venues for the 2020 season due to the venues being close to COVID-19 quarantine/isolation facilities (at the Rizal Memorial Coliseum and the Alonte Sports Arena).

The Games and Amusements Board allowed training sessions to be held at the PFF National Training Center in Carmona and the Blue Pitch at the Circuit Makati in Makati, Metro Manila.

Personnel and kits

Coaching changes

Interim coach
1.  Ernest Nierras was only able to join Stallion Laguna on November 2, 2020. Richard Leyble is Nierras' assistant coach.
2.  Oliver Colina was interim head coach for the 2020 AFC Cup. He took a leave-of absence from his original teams, Leylam FC and the Sacred Heart School-Ateneo de Cebu (SHS-AdC) Magis Eagles. Yu Hoshide took over sometime prior to the beginning of the season.
3.  Frank Muescan was named interim head coach by October 2020 prior to the start of the season due to Trevor Morgan not arriving yet despite being signed in as United City's coach.

Foreign players
A maximum of four foreigners are allowed per club which follows the Asian Football Confederation's (AFC) '3+1 rule'; three players of any nationality and a fourth coming from an AFC member nation. However, the PFF waived the regulations for the 2020 season due to difficulties teams had in entering in the PFL bubble, such as player commitments and in-team COVID cases.

Notes
1. Includes pre-season signings of players who weren't able to enter the PFL Bubble.

League table
<onlyinclude>

Notes
1. As a result of the 2021 Philippines Football League being cancelled due to the COVID-19 pandemic in the Philippines, the PFF nominated the 2020 champions, United City, as the participating club in the 2021 AFC Champions League Group Stage.
2. The Azkals Development Team are a guest team for the PFL and ineligible to qualify for AFC club competitions.

Positions by round

Results by round

Results

Season statistics

Scoring

Top goalscorers

Top assists

Hat-tricks

Clean sheets

Discipline

Red cards

Awards 
The following awards were given on November 9, 2020.

References

Philippines
Philippines
Philippines Football League seasons
Philippines Football League
Sports in Cavite
Philippines Football League, 2019-20